Fabriciana is a genus of butterflies in the family Nymphalidae, commonly found in Europe and Asia. The genus was erected by T. Reuss (T. Reuß) in 1920.

Taxonomy
This taxon used to be considered a subgenus of Argynnis, but has been reestablished as a separate genus in 2017.

Species
Listed alphabetically:

References

Further reading
 

 
Argynnini
Nymphalidae genera